Jaish al-Haramoun was an operations room of Syrian rebel factions that operated in eastern Quneitra and Rif Dimashq governorates of Syria.

After the loss at the Battle of Zabadani (2015) the operations rooms became largely defunct.

Members

 Ahrar ash-Sham
 al-Nusra Front
 Sword of al-Sham Brigades
 Ezz Brigade
 Jesus Christ Brigade
 Liwa Fursan al-Sunna
 Liwa Jabal al-Sheikh
 Liwa Osama bin Zaid
 Liwa Omar ibn al-Khattab
 Liwa Sayad al-Usud
 Harakat Shuhada al-Sham

See also
 List of armed groups in the Syrian Civil War

References

Anti-government factions of the Syrian civil war
Operations rooms of the Syrian civil war